The 2016 SAFF Women's Championship will be the fourth edition of the SAFF Women's Championship, the biennial international women's football championship contested by the national teams of the South Asian Football Federation (SAFF). The tournament will take place in India from 26 December 2016 to 4 January 2017, after the country was awarded hosting rights in January 2016. This will be the first time India will have hosted the SAFF Women's Championship.

Only players in these squads were eligible to take part in the tournament.

Group A

Bhutan

Maldives

Nepal
The final 20-player squad was announced on 9 December 2016.

Head coach: Kumar Thapa

Sri Lanka
The final 20-member squad for Sri Lanka was announced on 24 December.

Head coach: M. Jusmin

Group B

Afghanistan

Bangladesh
The final 20-member squad for Bangladesh was announced.

Head coach: Golam Robbani

 (Captain)

 (Vice-captain)

India
The final 20-member squad for India was announced on 22 December.

Head coach: Sajid Dar

References

squads